Members of the New South Wales Legislative Council who served from 1874 to 1877 were appointed for life by the Governor on the advice of the Premier. This list includes members between the beginning of the 1874–75 colonial election on 8 December 1874 and the beginning of the 1877 colonial election on 24 October 1877. The President was John Hay.

See also
First Parkes ministry
Third Robertson ministry
Second Parkes ministry
Fourth Robertson ministry

Notes

References

 

Members of New South Wales parliaments by term
19th-century Australian politicians